André N. Davis (born June 12, 1979) is a former American football wide receiver and kick returner. He was drafted by the Cleveland Browns in the second round of the 2002 NFL Draft.  He played college football at Virginia Tech. Davis also played for the New England Patriots, Buffalo Bills and Houston Texans in his career.  While playing for Virginia Tech Davis appeared on the cover of Sports Illustrated.

Early years
Davis was the star on the Niskayuna High School track and field team, where he also played soccer. Due to an argument with the Soccer coach he quit and joined the football team his JR year. He did not begin playing football until his junior year.

College career
Davis accepted a football scholarship from Virginia Tech, where he was a teammate of Michael Vick.  He scored the first touchdown for the Hokies in the 2000 Sugar Bowl game against Florida State, despite falling 46–29.  He was awarded the Today's Top VIII Award as a member of the Class of 2002. For his college accomplishments, he was enshrined in the Virginia Tech Sports Hall of Fame.

Professional career
Davis was drafted by the Cleveland Browns in the second round of the 2002 NFL Draft. Cleveland also selected Andra Davis in fifth round of that draft, requiring each player to have their full name on the back of their jersey. During his first three seasons in Cleveland, he played wide receiver and on special teams.  Davis scored on a 99-yard touchdown reception during a game on October 17, 2004, against the Cincinnati Bengals.  The reception ties Davis with twelve other players for the NFL record for longest career reception.

Davis spent 2005 and 2006 with the New England Patriots and Buffalo Bills respectively.  He was then signed by the Houston Texans for a one-year deal in 2007.  Davis started for the Texans, replacing an injured Andre Johnson in Week 3 of the 2007 NFL season.  He scored his first touchdown for the Texans on October 1, 2007 - Week 4 - against the Atlanta Falcons (35 yard touchdown reception).  Davis took over for an injured Jerome Mathis as a kick returner.  On December 30, in the last game of the 2007 regular season against the Jacksonville Jaguars, Davis scored two consecutive touchdowns on kickoff returns, the first for 97 yards and the second for 104.

It was reported February 28, 2008, that the Texans had reached an agreement with Davis to stay on the team.  He received $16 million over four years, with $8 million guaranteed.

On February 18, 2011, the Texans released Davis.

NFL records
 Longest touchdown reception: 99 (2004 vs Cincinnati Bengals) (tied with 12 others)
 Most kickoff return touchdowns in a single game: 2 (2007 vs Jacksonville Jaguars) (tied with 9 others)

Texans franchise records
 Most career kickoff return yards (2,473)
 Most career kickoff return touchdowns (3) (tied with Jerome Mathis)
 Longest kickoff return touchdown: 104 (2007)
 Most Kickoff Return Touchdowns: 3 (2007)
 Kickoff Return Average (season): 30.3 (2007)
 Receiving Average (Minimum 32 Receptions) (season): 17.7 (2007)

Family
Davis lives in Middletown, DE with his wife, Janelle, their children, Daylen, Bryce, Laila and Noelle.

See also
 List of NCAA major college football yearly receiving leaders

References

External links
 

1979 births
Living people
American football return specialists
American football wide receivers
Buffalo Bills players
Cleveland Browns players
Houston Texans players
New England Patriots players
Virginia Tech Hokies football players
People from Niskayuna, New York
Sportspeople from Schenectady, New York
Players of American football from New York (state)
African-American players of American football
21st-century African-American sportspeople
20th-century African-American sportspeople
People from Middletown, Delaware